Gino Ricci (8 December 1910 - ?) was an Italian javelin thrower, speciality in which he was 8th at the 1934 European Athletics Championships.

Achievements

See also
 Italy at the 1934 European Athletics Championships

References

External links
 Gino Ricci at Les-Sports.info

1910 births
Date of death missing
Place of death missing
Italian male javelin throwers